Czarnolesie may refer to the following places:
Czarnolesie, Lubusz Voivodeship (west Poland)
Czarnolesie, Pomeranian Voivodeship (north Poland)
Czarnolesie, West Pomeranian Voivodeship (north-west Poland)